Thad Jaracz (born December 15, 1946) is an American former basketball player, best known for his All-American college career at the University of Kentucky.

Jaracz came to UK from Lexington, Kentucky's Lafayette High School.  A 6'5" center, Jaracz anchored the middle as a sophomore for Adolph Rupp's undersized "Rupp's Runts" in 1965–66.  Jaracz was the team's third-leading scorer, averaging 13.2 points per game as the Wildcats made it to the 1966 NCAA championship game, where they famously lost to the Texas Western Miners, the first team to win a title with five black starters.  At the close of the season, Jaracz joined teammates Louie Dampier and Pat Riley on the Associated Press All-American team, earning third team honors.

Following the close of his college career in 1968, Jaracz was drafted both by the Boston Celtics of the National Basketball Association and the Kentucky Colonels of the American Basketball Association.  However, he never played in either league.  Instead, he entered into a military career, eventually overseeing the ROTC at the University of Louisville.

References

External links
College stats

1946 births
Living people
All-American college men's basketball players
Basketball players from Lexington, Kentucky
Boston Celtics draft picks
Centers (basketball)
Kentucky Colonels draft picks
Kentucky Wildcats men's basketball players
Power forwards (basketball)
American men's basketball players